

Works published
 Shokukokin Wakashū (続古今和歌集, "Collection of Ancient and Modern Times Continued") edited by Fujiwara no Tameie, Fujiwara no Motoie, Fujiwara no Ieyoshi, Fujiwara no Yukiee and Fujiwara no Mitsutoshi: a twenty-volume imperial anthology consisting of 1,925 Japanese waka ordered in 1259 by the Retired Emperor Go-Saga.
 Book of Aneirin (Welsh) written (or more probably copied) about this date.

Births
 c. June 1: Dante Alighieri (died 1321), Italian poet of the Middle Ages, author of Divine Comedy

Deaths
 Philippe de Rémi (born 1210), Old French poet and trouvère

Events

References

13th-century poetry
Poetry